Minquan Subdistrict is a subdistrict in Shihe District, Xinyang, Henan, China.

References

Subdistricts of the People's Republic of China
Township-level divisions of Henan
Xinyang